Christos Ardizoglou (born 25 March 1953) is a Greek former professional footballer who played as a right midfielder.

Early life
Ardizoglou was born in Jerusalem, where his family had found refuge after the Asia Minor disaster, from a Greek father and an Israeli mother. After living the first years of his life in Israel, his parents Dimitris and Aggeliki decided in 1958 to settle the family in Greece. The 5-year-old Christos found himself growing up with his five siblings in the slums of Nea Ionia, trying to mentally escape from the harsh financial poverty of everyday life in the most common way of the time. He started occasionally playing football and doing cycling training at the Amarousion Sports Club where he obtained his sports card. The  neighborhood scouts of the time were soon impressed by the skills of the young Ardizoglou, resulting in his move to the neighboring Rizoupoli and Apollon Athens.

Club career
Ardizoglou started his professional career at Apollon Athens playing as a left back. In 1972 Apollon were eventually relegated to the second division and Ardizoglou, who in the meantime has been converted to the position of wide midfielder, contributed in the club's return to the first division becoming one of their star players. In July 1974, even though Ardizoglou was very close to sing for Panathinaikos, the persistence of Loukas Barlos got him to dress in the colours of AEK Athens. The transfer cost the exorbitant sum for the time of 5 million drachmas plus Nikos Karoulias as an exchange and Ardizoglou got an apartment as a transfer gift.

His greatest moment was reaching the UEFA Cup semi-finals in 1977 even though he didn't compete due to punishment in an incident with Greece U19. On 1 November 1977 he scored the in the heavy 4–1 away defeat by Standard Liège for the UEFA Cup. He also contributed in the great 6–1 win over Porto on 13 November 1978 for European Cup, where he scored the second goal for his team. He played for AEK for 11 consecutive years, winning 2 Championships and 2 Greek Cups including a double in 1978. During the 1984–85 season, Ardizoglou came into conflict with the major shareholder of the club, Zafiropoulos and decided to leave AEK and return to Apollon Athens, where he played for a year before retiring as a footballer and later started coaching at the level of amateur football clubs and academies.

International career
Ardizoglou made his debut for Greece on 24 September 1975 in a match against Romania for the Balkan Cup. He was a participant at the UEFA Euro 1980. He played 43 times scoring 2 goals in total. He has also been invited once to the World's XI.

Managerial career
Ardizoglou was also the of manager Apollon Athens from 1 July 1998 to 3 September 1999.

After football
Ardizoglou is now retired from the Greek Police, in which he joined in the context of the search for a stable job in the State, as was customary for athletes of his time. He continuously participates in the events of the Veterans' Association of AEK Athens.

Honours

AEK Athens
Alpha Ethniki: 1977–78, 1978–79
Greek Cup: 1977–78, 1982–83

Individual
Greek Cup top scorer: 1975–76

References

External links

1953 births
Living people
Greek footballers
Greece international footballers
Association football midfielders
AEK Athens F.C. players
Apollon Smyrnis F.C. players
Atromitos F.C. players
Super League Greece players
UEFA Euro 1980 players
Footballers from Jerusalem
Footballers from Athens
Israeli people of Greek descent